Arbor Day is a 1936 Our Gang short comedy film directed by Fred C. Newmeyer.  It was the 145th Our Gang short that was released.

Plot
Spanky attempts to hide from the truant officer and avoid going to school, where he is being forced to participate in the Green Street Grammar School's annual Arbor Day show. Alfalfa tries to talk him out of his fears, but truant officer Smithers happens along to personally usher both children to school himself.

Meanwhile, a husband and wife midget pair (George and Olive Brasno) walk out on their circus sideshow jobs. They disguise themselves as children to enjoy a day about town, but Smithers mistakes them for actual children and takes them to school. At school, the kids trudge through their Arbor Day recitals and songs (Alfalfa contributes a squeaky rendition of Joyce Kilmer's "Trees" set to music by Oscar Rasbach. When the midgets-in-disguise offer to join in the show, they contribute a shimmy routine which shocks the entire audience of faculty and parents. The circus proprietor turns up to apprehend the two midgets, who, as they are carried away back to the circus, call out to the recital audience "Come by and see a good show sometime!" Principal Cass then informs Smithers he's fired, to Spanky and Alfala's delight.

Cast

The Gang
 Darla Hood as Darla
 George McFarland as Spanky
 Carl Switzer as Alfalfa
 Billie Thomas as Buckwheat

Additional cast
 Daniel Boone - Brown-haired boy in pageant
 Gloria Brown as Ballet dancer
 Betsy Gay as Ballet dancer
 George Brasno as Man Midget
 Olive Brasno as Woman Midget
 Maurice Cass as Mr. Cass
 George Guhl as Truant Officer Smithers
 Rosina Lawrence as Miss Lawrence
 Hattie McDaniel as Buckwheat's mother
 Dick Rush as Murphy, the side show barker
 Kathryn Sheldon as Miss Argyle
 May Wallace as Autograph Seeker
 John Collum as Classroom extra
 Jack Egger as Classroom extra
 Bobby Dunn as Crowd Extra
 Rolfe Sedan as Crowd Extra

Notes
Arbor Day marks a return Our Gang appearance for George and Olive Brasno, a brother-sister midget team who appeared in Shrimps for a Day a year prior. George Guhl portrays their nemesis truant officer. The film also features future Academy Award winner Hattie McDaniel as the mother of Billie "Buckwheat" Thomas, and Rosina Lawrence in her first appearance as the Gang's schoolteacher Miss Lawrence. Arbor Day was the last regular two-reel Our Gang comedy. All further releases in the series—save for the special release Our Gang Follies of 1938—would be one reel (approximately ten minutes) in length.
While not edited substantially for inclusion in the Little Rascals television syndication package from the 1950s to the 1990s, Arbor Day was moderately edited for time constraints when broadcast as part of the American Movie Classics network's Little Rascals package from 2001 to 2003.

References

See also
Our Gang filmography

External links

1936 films
American black-and-white films
1936 comedy films
Films directed by Fred C. Newmeyer
Hal Roach Studios short films
Our Gang films
1930s American films